The US Navy Mk II talker helmet was a combat helmet used by the US Navy from the Second World War and into the 1980s.

History 
In 1942, the US Navy decided to commission a special helmet for sailors posted on decks and tasked with transmitting orders by sound-powered telephone. The new helmet was to protect "exposed deck personnel" and accommodate a telephone headset; furthermore, it had to be usable while wearing a gas mask and binoculars.

The helmet was made of non-magnetic Hadefield manganese steel. Designated "USN MK-2", was at the time the largest helmet ever used in US service.

Gallery

References

External links

 Are Navy Helmets Bulletproof? Battleship New Jersey, Youtube - Show and tell video of M1 helmet and US Navy Mk II talker helmet

1940s fashion
20th-century fashion
Combat helmets of the United States
World War II military equipment of the United States
Military equipment introduced from 1940 to 1944